Haiden may refer to:
A Gewürztraminer wine
Haiden (Shinto), the hall of worship of a Shinto shrine

See also
 Heiden (disambiguation)